Silapathar is a city in Dhemaji district in the Indian state of Assam. The longest rail cum road bridge in India (Bogibeel bridge) connects Silapathar to Dibrugarh.

It is the commercial hub of Dhemaji district and Arunachal Pradesh, the place has a heady mix of indigenous communities like Mish

ing, Chutia, Ahom, Gorkhas, Deoris, Bengali.

Demographics

 India census, Silapathar had a population of 25662. Males constitute 52% of the population and females 48%. Silapathar has an average literacy rate of 83.25%, higher than the national average of 59.5%: male literacy is 87.72%, and female literacy is 78.39%. In Silapathar, 12% of the population is under 6 years of age.

Language

Bengali is the most spoken language at 10,917 speakers, followed by Assamese at 5,105, Hindi is spoken by 4,001 people, Mishing at 3,281 and Nepali at 1,521.

Transportation

Mohanbari Airport which falls under the city of Dibrugarh is the nearest airport from Silapathar.
Currently NH-52 now NH-15 is connected to the city, also Bogibeel bridge connects the city with NH-37.
ASTC provides bus services to nearby towns and cities. Private share taxi also flee across major towns and daily night services also transport large number of passengers to West Bengal, Nagaland, Arunachal Pradesh and Guwahati. Silapathar Railway Station under Rangiya Railway Division give access to people of the city and nearby areas to state capital Guwahati.
New Sissiborgaon and Silapathar railway station connect direct train to Dibrugarh Railway Station and from there one get easy access to Dibrugarh Rajdhani Express.

It is well connected to the state and the country through roadways, railways and airways.

Education

Schools
 Silapathar Residential Higher Secondary School
 Silapathar Town High School
 Silapathar Town Girls High School
 Don Bosco High School
 Lord Macaulay High School
 Silapthar Residential English High School
 SFS School
 Trinity Academy
 Lord Macaulay School
 Utopian Academy
 Sun Valley Academy

Colleges
 Silapathar College
 Silapathar Town College
 Silapathar Science College
 Silapthar junior science college
 Purbanchal college
 Abutani College

Politics
Silapathar is part of Lakhimpur (Lok Sabha constituency).Mr. Pradan Barua from BJP is the present MP from this constituency. in Assam.

References

Cities and towns in Dhemaji district
Dhemaji